The Hottest New Group in Jazz, also known by its full title Lambert, Hendricks, & Ross!: "The Hottest New Group in Jazz" or alternatively considered self-titled, is the fourth album by Lambert, Hendricks & Ross, released in 1960. The title is a quote from Downbeat magazine. The CD reissue combines the full original album with the group's two other Columbia albums: the 1961 LP Lambert, Hendricks & Ross Sing Ellington and the 1962 LP High Flying. The CD release additionally includes seven previously unreleased "rarities", recorded in 1962. On all these recordings, the group is backed up by the Ike Isaacs Trio.

Track listing

Original album
 "Charleston Alley" (Horace Henderson, Jon Hendricks, Leroy Kirkland) – 3:21
 "Moanin'" (Bobby Timmons) – 2:37
 "Twisted" (Wardell Gray, Annie Ross) – 2:19
 "Bijou" (Ralph Burns, Jon Hendricks) – 3:19
 "Cloudburst" (Jimmy Harris, Leroy Kirkland) – 2:18
 "Centerpiece" (Harry Edison, Jon Hendricks) – 2:29
 "Gimme That Wine" (Jon Hendricks) – 3:00
 "Sermonette" (Cannonball Adderley, Jon Hendricks) – 3:50
 "Summertime" (based on the recording of Miles Davis & Gil Evans) (George Gershwin, Ira Gershwin, DuBose Heyward) – 1:46
 "Everybody's Boppin'" (Jon Hendricks) – 4:13

CD extras, disc one
 "Cotton Tail" (Duke Ellington) – 2:57
 "All Too Soon" (Duke Ellington, Carl Sigman) – 3:29
 "Happy Anatomy" (Duke Ellington) – 1:20
 "Rocks in My Bed" (Duke Ellington) – 3:11
 "Main Stem" (Duke Ellington) – 2:56
 "I Don't Know What Kind of Blues I've Got" (Duke Ellington) – 3:31
 "Things Ain't What They Used to Be" (Mercer Ellington, Ted Persons) – 2:50
 "Midnight Indigo" (Duke Ellington) – 2:35
 "What am I Here For?" (Duke Ellington, Frankie Laine) – 3:01
 "In a Mellow Tone" (Duke Ellington, Milt Gabler) – 3:31
 "Caravan" (Duke Ellington, Irving Mills, Juan Tizol) – 2:34

CD disc two
 "Come On Home" (Horace Silver) – 5:30
 "The New ABC" (Dave Lambert) – 3:08
 "Farmer's Market" (Art Farmer, Annie Ross) – 2:34
 "Cookin' at the Continental" (Jon Hendricks, Horace Silver) – 3:08
 "With Malice Toward None" (Jon Hendricks, Tom McIntosh) – 2:51
 "Hi-Fly" (Randy Weston) – 3:47
 "Home Cookin'" (Horace Silver) – 4:27
 "Halloween Spooks" (Dave Lambert) – 2:19
 "Popity Pop" (Slim Gaillard) – 4:49
 "Blue" (Gildo Mahones) – 3:51
 "Mr. P.C." (John Coltrane) – 3:20
 "Walkin'" (Richard Carpenter) – 2:17
 "This Here (Dis Hyunh)" (Jon Hendricks, Bobby Timmons) – 4:10
 "Swingin' Till the Girls Come Home" (Oscar Pettiford) – 5:22
 "Twist City" (Matthew Gee) – 2:25
 "Just a Little Bit of Twist" (Don Covay) – 2:24
 "A Night in Tunisia" (Dizzy Gillespie, Frank Paparelli) – 2:45
 "A Night in Tunisia" (Alternate Version) (Dizzy Gillespie, Frank Paparelli) – 2:44

Personnel

Musicians
Walter Bolden – drums
Ron Carter – bass
Harry "Sweets" Edison – trumpet
Jon Hendricks – vocals
Ike Isaacs – bass
Dave Lambert – vocals
Gildo Mahones – piano
Stu Martin – drums
Pony Poindexter – alto saxophone
Annie Ross – vocals
Jimmy Wormworth – drums
William Yancy – bass

Production
Steve Berdowitz  – reissue series
Curtis Brown – liner notes
Robert Constanzo – packaging manager
Will Friedwald – liner notes
Kevin Gore – reissue series
Don Hunstein – photography
Teo Macero – producer
Randall Martin – design
Nedra Olds-Neal – reissue producer
Seth Rothstein – production coordination, project director
Tony Sellari – art direction, reissue art director
Vernon Smith – photography
Irving Townsend – producer
Mark Wilder – digital mastering, digital remastering

References

1960 albums
Columbia Records albums
Lambert, Hendricks & Ross albums
Albums produced by Teo Macero
Albums produced by Irving Townsend
Vocal jazz albums